The Boys in Company C is a 1978 war film directed by Sidney J. Furie about United States Marine Corps recruits preparing for duty and their subsequent combat in the Vietnam War. It stars Stan Shaw, Andrew Stevens, Craig Wasson and Michael Lembeck. It was among the first Vietnam War films to appear after the Vietnam Era, and was also the first role for R. Lee Ermey of Full Metal Jacket fame. It is the first in Furie's Vietnam War motion-picture trilogy, followed by Under Heavy Fire (2001) and The Veteran (2006).

The film was a co-production of Golden Harvest and Columbia Pictures, the latter originally handling theatrical distribution. It was filmed in the Philippines.

Wasson plays guitar and sings the theme song "Here I Am", used within the film and over the end credits.

Plot

In August, 1967, a group of young men (the "boys" referenced in the movie title) arrive for recruit training at Marine Corps Recruit Depot San Diego. They include a draft dodging hippie, Dave Bisbee, who is delivered in handcuffs from Seattle, Washington by FBI agents. Other recruit trainee characters include a hardened drug dealer, Tyrone Washington, from Chicago, Illinois; a naive and unassuming Billy Ray Pike from Galveston, Texas; a streetwise ladies' man, Vinnie Fazio, from Brooklyn, New York, and a mild-mannered aspiring writer Alvin Foster from Emporia, Kansas, who begins writing a journal detailing his experiences.

The five young men go through Marine Corps boot camp together. The training is dehumanizing and brutal, designed to make them think and act as a unified team. Sergeant Loyce and Staff Sergeant Aquilla use a combination of extreme training, brute force, and their own combat experience to teach the recruits. Washington's leadership skills flourish and he is promoted to Platoon Guide. After recruit training, the five are then assigned to the same Marine FMF unit and shipped to Vietnam. As their transport ship docks, a bombardment from enemy artillery begins. To these characters, Vietnam is a bewildering chaos of bureaucratic incompetence, callous officers concerned only with monthly body counts, and the constant threat of death.

The Marines' first firefight occurs while they are taking "vital supplies" to an army outpost. Those supplies turn out to be crates of cigarettes, liquor and furniture being sent to a general for his birthday, and two men die in the fighting. The officers in Company C are mostly incompetents who endanger the lives of their men through blind adherence to rules or timetables; their nervous Marines open fire on anyone and anything at the slightest provocation.

In January 1968, Company C is ordered by its commanding officer to throw (lose) a soccer game against a team of South Vietnamese in order to bolster the morale of their ally. The Americans are told that if they lose, they will see no more combat; if they win, they will be sent to Khe Sanh. Despite everything, the Americans win. The game ends with a Vietcong attack, during which Foster heroically throws himself on a grenade to save some children.

The film concludes with the final entry in Foster's journal, written moments before his death: "I don't know why I should even bother to write in this journal anymore. Because after what happened today, who the hell is ever going to believe it? We actually had a chance to get out of this goddamn war. All we had to do was throw the game and walk away. But for some reason, we just couldn't. For some reason, winning that stupid game was more important than saving our ass. So I guess we'll just keep on walking into one bloody mess after another, until somebody finally figures out that living has got to be more important than winning."

Before the closing credits, the fates of the remaining principal characters are revealed as follows.  It is revealed that Washington was killed in action and posthumously awarded the Navy Cross, while Fazio was seriously wounded and as a result of his injuries, was permanently confined to the VA hospital in Los Angeles. Pike deserted from the hospital in Da Nang and returned to the US, eventually moving to Canada, where he now lives with his wife and son.

Cast
 Stan Shaw as Tyrone Washington
 Andrew Stevens as Billy Ray Pike
 James Canning as Alvin Foster
 Michael Lembeck as Vinnie Fazio
 Craig Wasson as Dave Bisbee
 Scott Hylands as Captain Collins
 James Whitmore, Jr. as Lieutenant Archer
 Noble Willingham as Sergeant Curry
 Lee Ermey as Staff Sergeant Loyce, junior drill instructor, later promoted to staff sergeant, succeeding Aquilla as senior drill instructor.
 Vic Diaz as Colonel Trang

Nominations
Andrew Stevens was nominated for the Golden Globe for Best Motion Picture Acting Debut – Male (1979).

Home media
This film has been issued numerous times on video since its theatrical release, first in-house via Columbia Pictures, and later through other companies as certain ancillary rights changed hands (it ended up becoming part of the library of ITC Entertainment). Today, the major rights are held by independent film company Fortune Star Media, which also now holds the film's copyright, with distribution by Hen's Tooth under license.

References

External links

1978 films
1970s war comedy-drama films
American satirical films
American war comedy-drama films
Anti-war films about the Vietnam War
Vietnam War films
American association football films
Columbia Pictures films
1970s English-language films
Films directed by Sidney J. Furie
Films set in 1967
Films set in 1968
Films set in San Diego
Films set in Vietnam
Films shot in the Philippines
Hong Kong war drama films
Films about the United States Marine Corps
1970s American films